The 1978 Indian Federation Cup Final was the 2nd final of the Indian Federation Cup, the top knock-out competition in India, and was contested between Kolkata giants East Bengal and Mohun Bagan on 7 May 1978 and the replay on 9 May 1978 at the Jawaharlal Nehru Stadium in Coimbatore, Tamil Nadu.

Both the teams were announced as joint winners after both the matches ended 0–0 after full time.

Route to the final

Match

Summary
The Federation Cup final began at the Jawaharlal Nehru Stadium in Coimbatore on 7 May 1978 in front of a packed crowd as two Kolkata giants East Bengal and Mohun Bagan faced each other in the Kolkata Derby. Ranjit Mukherjee's header came off the crossbar in the opening minutes of the game as East Bengal created more chances in the first half while Mohun Bagan was dominant in the second half. Shibaji Banerjee of Mohun Bagan was shown a yellow card for time wasting while Surajit Sengupta of East Bengal was carded for a foul on Dilip Palit in the second half of the game. Both teams canceled each other out as none of them was able to break the deadlock and the game ended in a 0–0 stalemate. The final was replayed on 9 May 1978 and once again the game ended in a 0–0 draw and both the teams were announced as joint winners, with both East Bengal and Mohun Bagan won their first-ever Federation Cup title.

Details

Replay

See also
 India - List of Federation Cup Winners

References

Indian Federation Cup Finals
1978–79 in Indian football
East Bengal Club matches
Mohun Bagan AC matches